Life As We Knew It is a young adult science fiction novel by American author Susan Beth Pfeffer, first published in 2006 by Harcourt Books. It is the first book in The Last Survivors series, followed by The Dead and the Gone. When an asteroid hits the moon and brings it closer to Earth, life in Northeastern Pennsylvania will never be the same again for Miranda and her family. The lack of food and extreme cold provides major threats to their survival.

Synopsis 
The book portrays 16-year-old Miranda, living a normal life in Pennsylvania with her mother, Laura, and her brothers Matt and Jonny. Her biggest worries are her grades and her conflicted feelings about becoming a godmother to her soon-to-be-born half-sibling, who is expected by her father and his second wife Lisa. Soon, the news becomes focused on one subject: an asteroid predicted to hit the moon. People are excited about the opportunity to witness the event, and on the night of the impact, Miranda and her family go outside to witness it. However, the asteroid was denser than expected by scientists, and immediately after impact, it becomes apparent that something is wrong. The moon has been pushed closer to the Earth by the impact, intensifying the tidal forces that the moon exerts on the earth.

Life on earth is shattered, and the lives of Miranda and her family are no exception. Almost immediately following the lunar impact, tsunamis and earthquakes begin ravaging the coasts of many countries, causing millions of deaths. Chaos erupts and Miranda and her family go shopping to stock up on food, water, and supplies before the stores are emptied. Miranda's older brother Matt comes home from college. Living inland, they are safe from tsunamis, but as the summer goes on, another threat looms. The increased tidal forces from the moon are causing magma to be forced up to the surface, resulting in the eruptions of many dormant volcanoes, which cover the sky in ash. This causes temperature to drop dramatically, enough for frost to appear by mid-August and for 20-degree weather by October, making it dramatically more difficult for plants to grow. As circumstances become harsher for the family, they start eating less to conserve food. Laura often goes without eating at all in an entire day, and makes other sacrifices to give Jonny, who Miranda is convinced Laura considers to be the strongest of her children, the best chance at survival. This often becomes a source of conflict between Miranda and her mother.

Winter proves to be especially harrowing. With little food, the family must also deal with snow, a lack of running water, and no natural gas or electricity. A severe outbreak of influenza spreads through town, killing hundreds of people, including Peter, a doctor with whom Laura was developing a relationship. However, Miranda is spared, and nurses her mother and brothers back to health. As the family becomes more and more isolated, as nearly everyone else is either leaving town or dying, they continue to fight for survival. As the family's food supply comes very close to running out, Miranda ventures into town. She says that it is to see whether there has been a letter from her father and Lisa, though in her heart she knows that she is dying of starvation and her intention is to die away from her home, where her mother will not have to see it. Miranda finds the post office abandoned, and as she is about to lie down and let the cold kill her, a yellow piece of paper attracts her gaze. The paper leads her to the town hall, where, to her shock, she discovers the mayor is giving out bags of food. There are few takers, as many people are dead or have emigrated, and even more have no way of knowing about the program. The family is given four bags of food and is promised more to come in the following weeks. With a renewed will to carry on, Miranda muses on her seventeenth birthday about why she is still keeping a diary. Perhaps it is for the people who might read it in the future, or perhaps it for herself, helping her to process her ideas, feelings, and reasons to cling to life and hope.

Characters

Miranda Evans: A 16-year-old girl. The novel's point of view is her diary entries. She has two brothers, Jonny whom she is jealous of, and Matt whom she idolizes, but she cares greatly for both of them. Her favorite hobby used to be ice skating, but prior to the book's events, she suffered a broken ankle and forcing her to switch to swimming. She still has a passion for ice skating, idolizing Brandon Erlich, a famous skater from her town. Later on in the novel, she is the only one of her family to not contract a life-threatening strain of flu.

Matt Evans: Miranda's 19-year-old brother who was studying at Cornell University before returning to his family after the event. He provides for the family, collecting firewood and doing manual labor, making deals for supplies, and volunteering at the post office. He is looked up to by his mother and siblings.

Jonathan "Jonny" Evans: Miranda's 13-year-old brother who has a passion for baseball. The family considers him to be the most likely to survive, but Jonny is scared of living without the rest of his family, and uncomfortable that he eats more than the others do.

Laura Evans: Miranda's mother, a writer. She puts her family's lives ahead of her own, starving herself so her children can have more to eat. She dates Peter during the novel. Later in the book, she sprains her ankle twice, immobilizing her.

Mrs. Nesbitt: An elderly woman who is like family to the Evanses, having cared for Miranda's mother when she was a child. She passes away during the novel, leaving all of her food, water, and belongings to Miranda's family.

Dr. Peter Elliot: Laura's boyfriend, a doctor. He works throughout the events, and visits several times, sometimes bringing food and giving medical advice. He dies from flu and exhaustion.

Hal/Dad: Miranda's father. He is divorced from her mother and married to Lisa, who is pregnant with Miranda's soon-to-be goddaughter. He cares for his children very much, bringing them food he bought on the black market when he and Lisa stop in on their way from Springfield to Lisa's parents' house in Colorado.

Lisa: Miranda's pregnant stepmother, whose child Miranda will be godmother to.

Megan Wayne: Miranda's devoutly Christian friend. She used to be carefree before she went to church, an interest that began when their mutual friend Becky died. She begins to starve herself with the encouragement of her pastor, who tells the congregation that God is punishing the human race for their sins.

Sammi: One of Miranda's friends, who is boy crazy. She had been with numerous boys and fights with Megan, who believes that she leads an immoral life. Sammi leaves town with a older man who she believes will provide her with protection.

George: Sammi's 40-year-old boyfriend, with whom she moves to Nashville.

Becky: Miranda's friend whom she constantly dreams about. She died before the book begins. She was "like the glue" between Miranda, Megan, and Sammi, and when she died, they began to separate.

Dan: A boy on Miranda's swim team, with whom she begins to swim in the local pond, Miller's Pond, after their local indoor pool is closed. They have a short-lived romance before Dan leaves in search of a better place to live. 

Horton: The beloved family cat, who is particularly close to Jonny. 

Mrs. Wayne: Megan's mother. She worries that her daughter is starving herself, as she does not share Megan's religious beliefs. 

Brandon Erlich: An ice skater from their town who is training for the Olympics. He is idolized by skaters worldwide. He has a fan-site dedicated to him, which Miranda visits frequently before the event. One day she surprisingly meets him at a frozen lake, where they talk and skate. Although she returns to the lake, she never sees him again. It is assumed he died or left Howell, although their meeting may have been all in Miranda's imagination.

Reverend Marshall: The pastor at Megan's church. By telling his congregation that God will sustain them, and behaving in a falsely caring manner, he ensures that they bring him food by way of thanks. This means that he has much more to eat than most people, something which greatly enrages Miranda.

Mayor Ford and Tom Danworth: The local mayor and another city employee. They appear at the very end of the book, having organised a food distribution system.

Reception
Kirkus Reviews said that "death is a constant threat, and Pfeffer instills despair right to the end but is cognizant to provide a ray of hope with a promising conclusion. Plausible science fiction with a frighteningly realistic reminder of recent tragedies here and abroad."  Ilene Cooper said in her review for Booklist that "each page is filled with events both wearying and terrifying and infused with honest emotions.  Pfeffer bring's cataclysmic tragedy very close."

Awards
Pfeffer's book was named Young Adult Library Services Association's Best Books for Young Adults in 2007, and shortlisted for the Andre Norton Award for Outstanding Science Fiction or Fantasy Book of 2007. In addition, it won the Booklist Editor's Choice Award for Books for Youth (Older Reader's Category) in 2006. It was nominated for the 2009 Rebecca Caudill Young Readers' Book Award and won the Truman Readers Award of 2009.

References

2006 American novels
American young adult novels
American science fiction novels
Children's science fiction novels
Fictional diaries
Novels about impact events
Climate change novels
Novels set in Pennsylvania